Henry George Gordon Myers (16 November 1921 – 9 July 1999) was an Australian rules footballer who played with St Kilda in the Victorian Football League (VFL).

Myers served in the Royal Australian Navy during World War II.

Notes

External links 

1921 births
1999 deaths
Australian rules footballers from Melbourne
St Kilda Football Club players
People from West Melbourne, Victoria